Christopher Clark (born 15 September 1980) is a former Scottish footballer, who last played for Highland League club Cove Rangers. Clark previously played for Aberdeen (in two spells) and Plymouth Argyle. He has also represented his country at B level.

Club career

Aberdeen
Clark began his career at Aberdeen, and firmly established himself as a first-team regular, playing all but one game for the club in the 2006–07 season, in which the Dons qualified for European football. A versatile player, Clark was used predominantly in midfield, but was also played at either full-back position. Clark earned plaudits for his "industrious" performances in Aberdeen's central midfield, but found the net infrequently, scoring just 10 times in 236 appearances.

Plymouth Argyle
Clark signed a three-and-a-half-year deal with Plymouth Argyle in January 2008, following a bid of £200,000 that had been accepted by Aberdeen. "Chris can play in four or five positions so it's a great benefit to us that he comes with that great pedigree," said manager Paul Sturrock. He made his debut for Argyle in the FA Cup against Portsmouth and scored to give them a lead against Premier League opposition. He was in and out of the team for the remainder of the season, but during the 2008–09 season Clark was ever-present in the first eleven, putting in a string of impressive performances on the left and right-wing. Having made 116 appearances in all competitions for the club, scoring four goals, he was one of nine first team players that were released at the end of the 2010–11 season before their contracts expired in June 2011.

Return to Aberdeen
At the end of June, Clark rejoined his former club Aberdeen on a free transfer. "I know other clubs were interested but the family love it in the North-East and it's fantastic to see so many familiar faces," he said. A move to Kilmarnock looked likely before he chose to return to Pittodrie. "I heard he was signing for Killie and had ruled out getting him," said manager Craig Brown. "When we found out there was still a chance we could get him, we did what we could to make that happen. He is exactly what we have been looking for". He was re-united with two former teammates from Plymouth Argyle as Kari Arnason and Rory Fallon also joined The Dons. On 7 April 2012, Clark scored his first goal since his return to the club in the 3–1 New Firm derby win against Dundee United at Pittodrie.

Cove Rangers
Clark was released by Aberdeen in the January 2014 transfer window and signed for Cove Rangers on 4 February 2014.

International
In November 2006, Clark made his Scotland B debut against Ireland B, and has gone on to make two more appearances for the Scotland B team.

Career statistics

Club

Appearances and goals by club, season and competition

References

External links

1980 births
People from Elgin, Moray
Living people
Association football midfielders
Scottish footballers
Scotland B international footballers
Aberdeen F.C. players
Plymouth Argyle F.C. players
Scottish Premier League players
English Football League players
People educated at Elgin Academy, Moray
Cove Rangers F.C. players
Sportspeople from Moray